Fort Rivière is a ruined mountain fort in Haiti on the summit of Montagne Noire, Saint-Raphaël Arrondissement. It is on the north coast of Haiti to the south of Grande-Rivière-du-Nord and 20 miles south of Cap-Haïtien. It was a French bastion fort that was the site of the defeat of the Haitian rebel force called the Cacos on 17 November 1915.

Historical background
In 1915, Haiti was in a state of political upheaval. On 28 July 1915, two companies of the United States Marines and three United States Navy sailors landed in Haiti, beginning a nineteen-year occupation of Haiti by the U.S. Marines.

The marines and sailors under Admiral William B. Caperton rapidly reestablished an interim government. Police, customs, schools and hospitals were all placed under the purview of the Marine and Naval personnel assigned to the occupation.

The marines established a law enforcing constabulary, commanded by Marine non-commissioned officers who were granted Haitian commissions as officers and leaders of native troops. This group (which was called the Gendarmerie d'Haiti) was assigned to enforce all laws of the country while providing a quasi-military force. They were backed by the 1st Marine Brigade with 88 officers and 1,941 men guarding ten towns (armed with Krag–Jørgensen rifles).

Conflict between U.S. forces and the Cacos
The establishment of an interim government and law enforcement presence did not satisfy the Cacos, a group of rebels. On the northern end of the country, skirmishing continued in the villages and mountains. In October 1915 (after a brief ceasefire), the Cacos began again their assault on U.S. forces in government-controlled towns. It was during this same period that Gunnery Sergeant Daniel Daly and Major Smedley Butler (two marines who had received one Medal of Honor each for separate actions) were each awarded their second Medal of Honor.

On 17 November 1915, Butler (who was leading a force of marines and sailors) surrounded the last stronghold of the Cacos at Fort Rivière on a mountain to the south of Grand Riviere du Nord. At 7:30 a.m., Butler signaled (by whistle) all his troops to attack. The surprise was successful, confusing the Cacos. Crawling through a tunnel, Butler and his men were involved in hand-to-hand fighting. The Americans captured the fort.

See also

 Battle of Fort Riviere
 History of the United States Marine Corps

References

Banana Wars
Riviere
United States Marine Corps in the 20th century